Portunus pelagicus, also known as the flower crab, blue crab, blue swimmer crab, blue manna crab or sand crab, rajungan in Indonesian, and alimasag in Tagalog, Kapampangan, and Pangasinan, is a large crab found in the Indo-Pacific, including off the coasts of Indonesia, Cambodia, Thailand, the Philippines, and Vietnam; and in the intertidal estuaries around most of Australia and east to New Caledonia.

Description
The males are bright blue in color with white spots and with characteristically long chelipeds, while the females have a duller green/brown, with a more rounded carapace.

Behaviour

They stay buried under sand or mud most of the time, particularly during the daytime and winter, which may explain their high tolerance to ammonium (NH4+) and ammonia (NH3). They come out to feed during high tide on various organisms such as bivalves, fish and, to a lesser extent, macroalgae. They are excellent swimmers, largely due to a pair of flattened legs that resemble paddles. However, in contrast to another portunid crab (Scylla serrata), they cannot survive for long periods out of the water.

Capture
The species is commercially important throughout the Indo-Pacific where they may be sold as traditional hard shells, or as "soft-shelled" crabs, which are considered a delicacy throughout Asia. The species is highly prized as the meat is almost as sweet as Callinectes sapidus. This species is fished heavily and almost exclusively for meat consumption in the Persian Gulf with the females sold at higher prices than males.

These characteristics, along with their fast growth, ease of larviculture, high fecundity and relatively high tolerance to both nitrate and ammonia, (particularly ammoniacal nitrogen, NH3–N, which is typically more toxic than ammonium, as it can more easily diffuse across the gill membranes), makes this species ideal for aquaculture.

The species is commercially fished in Australia, and is also available to recreational fishers and regulated by various state governments. Relevant recreational fishing regulations for Australia (as of March 2016) are tabled below.

Ecology

P. pelagicus commonly enters estuaries for food and shelter. Its life cycle is dependent on estuaries as the larvae and early juveniles use these habitats for growth and development. Prior to hatching, the female moves into shallow marine habitats, releases her eggs and the newly hatched zoea I larvae move into estuaries. During this time they feed on microscopic plankton and progress from the zoea I stage to the zoea IV stage (approximately 8 days) and then to the final larval stage of megalopa (duration of 4–6 days). This larval stage is characterised by having large chelipeds used to catch prey. Once the megalopa metamorphoses to the crab stage they continue to spend time in estuaries which provides a suitable habitat for shelter and food. However, evidence has shown that early juveniles cannot tolerate low salinities for extended periods, which is likely due to its weak hyper-osmoregulatory abilities. This may explain their mass emigration from estuaries to seawater during the rainy season. Male Portunus pelagicus are believed to become more territorial in colder water. This may explain why male crabs are rarely sighted within a close proximity to each other in more temperate waters; it also may explain why their female counterparts seem more prolific in these such areas.

References

External links
Fisheries Western Australia - Blue Swimmer Crab Fact Sheet

 

Portunoidea
Edible crustaceans
Commercial crustaceans
Crustaceans described in 1758
Taxa named by Carl Linnaeus